Dormant, "sleeping", may refer to:

Science 
Dormancy in an organism's life cycle
Dormant volcano, a volcano that is inactive but may become active in the future

Culture 
Dormant, a heraldry attitude signifying a sleeping animal with head resting upon paws
Dormant title, an hereditary title of nobility or baronetcy for which the rightful claimant has yet to be found
Dormant, an order of knighthood which is no longer conferred

Economics
Dormant company, a currently inactive company
Dormant bank account, a bank account which lacks activity